KPAN 860 AM is a radio station licensed to Hereford, Texas.  The station airs a country music format and is owned by KPAN Broadcasters.

References

External links
KPAN's official website

Country radio stations in the United States
PAN